Mickaël Dodzi Dogbé (born 28 November 1976) is a former professional footballer who played as a forward. Born in France, he represented Togo at international level.

International career
He was part of the Togolese squad at the 2006 African Nations Cup team, which finished bottom of group B in the first round of competition, thus failing to secure qualification for the quarter-finals of the ANC.

External links

1976 births
Living people
Footballers from Paris
French sportspeople of Togolese descent
Citizens of Togo through descent
French footballers
Togolese footballers
Togo international footballers
Togolese expatriate footballers
2002 African Cup of Nations players
2006 Africa Cup of Nations players
Ligue 2 players
Grenoble Foot 38 players
Ligue 1 players
AS Saint-Étienne players
FC Rouen players
Expatriate footballers in the United Arab Emirates
Al-Nasr SC (Dubai) players
Dubai CSC players
Fujairah FC players
US Boulogne players
Expatriate footballers in Egypt
Association football forwards
UAE First Division League players
UAE Pro League players
ESA Linas-Montlhéry players
FC Fleury 91 players
FC Vevey United players
Expatriate footballers in Switzerland
French expatriate sportspeople in Switzerland
Togolese expatriate sportspeople in Switzerland
Togolese expatriate sportspeople in the United Arab Emirates
Togolese expatriate sportspeople in Egypt